The Chung Li-ho Museum is a museum in Meinong District, Kaohsiung, Taiwan. The museum is dedicated to Taiwanese novelist Chung Li-ho.

History
The idea to establish the museum started in June 1979 and the construction work of the building was completed in August 1983. It was the first museum writer's museum in Taiwan to be built by a citizens' organization. In 1997, the statue of Chung was erected and trail park was constructed at both sides of the museum by Kaohsiung County Government.

Architecture
The museum is housed in a two-story building covering a total area of 1,655 m2. It is located at the foothill of Mount Jianshan. The main theme of its architectural design is Taiwanese homes.

Exhibitions
The museum houses manuscripts and objects of Chung's life. In addition to that, manuscripts of other Taiwanese writers are also collected and exhibited in this museum.

See also
 List of museums in Taiwan

References

External links

 

1983 establishments in Taiwan
Biographical museums in Taiwan
Literary museums in Taiwan
Museums established in 1979
Museums in Kaohsiung